The Life Guards (LG) is the senior regiment of the British Army and part of the Household Cavalry, along with the Blues and Royals.

History
The Life Guards grew from the four troops of Horse Guards (exclusively formed of gentlemen-troopers until the transformation of the last two remaining troops into Regiments of Life Guards in 1788) raised by Charles II around the time of his restoration, plus two troops of Horse Grenadier Guards (rank and file composed of commoners), which were raised some years later.
 The first troop was originally raised in Bruges in 1658 as His Majesty's Own Troop of Horse Guards. They formed part of the contingent raised by the exiled King Charles II as his contribution to the army of King Philip IV of Spain who were fighting the French and their allies the English Commonwealth under the Lord Protector Oliver Cromwell in the Franco-Spanish War and the concurrent Anglo-Spanish War.
 The second troop was founded in 1659 as Monck's Life Guards.
 The third troop, like the first troop was formed in 1658 from exiled Royalists and was initially known as The Duke of York's Troop of Horse Guards.
 The fourth troop was raised in 1661 in England.
 The first troop of horse grenadier guards was formed in 1693 from the amalgamation of three troops of grenadiers.
 The second troop of horse grenadier guards was raised in Scotland in 1702.

These units first saw action during the Third Anglo-Dutch War in 1672 and then at the Battle of Sedgemoor during the Monmouth Rebellion in 1685.

The 3rd and 4th troops were disbanded in 1746. In 1788, the remaining 1st and 2nd troops, along with the two troops of Horse Grenadier Guards, were reorganised into two regiments, the 1st and 2nd Regiments of Life Guards (from 1877, simply 1st Life Guards and 2nd Life Guards). From then on (1788), rank and file were mostly formed of commoners (pejorative nickname: "cheesemongers"), the bulk of the gentlemen-troopers were pensioned off.

In 1815 they were part of The Household Brigade at the Battle of Waterloo under Major-General Lord Edward Somerset.

In 1821, the Life Guards under the command of Captain Oakes fired upon mourners trying to redirect the funeral procession of Queen Caroline through the city of London. Two civilians were killed. Though charges of manslaughter and murder were brought, no guardsmen were prosecuted.

In late 1918, after much service in the First World War, the two regiments gave up their horses and were re-roled as machine gun battalions, becoming the 1st and 2nd Battalions, Guards Machine Gun Regiment. They reverted to their previous names and roles after the end of the war. In 1922, the two regiments were merged into one regiment, The Life Guards (1st and 2nd). In 1928, it was re-designated The Life Guards.

During the Second World War, the Life Guards took part in the Normandy landings and the advance through France to liberate Brussels.

In 1992, as part of the Options for Change defence review, The Life Guards were joined together with the Blues and Royals in a 'Union', not an amalgamation, forming the Household Cavalry Regiment (armoured reconnaissance) and the Household Cavalry Mounted Regiment (ceremonial duties). However, they maintain their regimental identity, with distinct uniforms and traditions, and their own colonel.
In common with the Blues and Royals, they have a peculiar non-commissioned rank structure: In brief, they lack sergeants, replacing them with multiple grades of corporal.

Previous names
Names used by the regiment were as follows:
 From 1788, 1st Regiment of Life Guards and 2nd Regiment of Life Guards
 The following troops were reorganised into 1st Regiment of Life Guards
 1st Troop of Horse Guards
 1st Troop, Horse Grenadier Guards
 and the following troops were reorganised into 2nd Regiment of Life Guards
 2nd Troop of Horse Guards
 2nd Troop (Scots), Horse Grenadier Guards
 From 1877, 1st Life Guards and 2nd Life Guards
 From 1922, The Life Guards (1st and 2nd)
 From 1928, The Life Guards

Uniform

On ceremonial occasions the Life Guards wear a scarlet tunic, a metal cuirass and a matching helmet with a white plume worn bound on the top into an 'onion' shape; the exceptions to this are the regiment's trumpeters, who wear a red plume, and farriers, who wear blue tunics and have a black plume. In addition, the Life Guards wear their chin strap below their lower lip, as opposed to the Blues and Royals who wear it under their chin. On service dress the Life Guards Officers and Warrant Officers Class One wear a red lanyard on the right shoulder, as well as a Sam Browne belt. The Life Guards, as part of the Household Division, does not use the Order of the Bath Star for its officer rank "pips", but rather the Order of the Garter Star.

Battle honours
The battle honours are:
[combined battle honours of 1st Life Guards and 2nd Life Guards, with the following emblazoned]:
Dettingen, Peninsula, Waterloo, Tel-el-Kebir, Egypt 1882, Relief of Kimberley, Paardeberg, South Africa 1899–1900
The Great War: Mons, Le Cateau, Marne 1914, Aisne 1914, Messines 1914, Ypres 1914, Passchendaele 1917 '18, Somme 1916 '18, Arras 1917 '18, Hindenburg Line, France and Flanders 1914–18
The Second World War: Mont Pincon, Souleuvre, Noireau Crossing, Amiens 1944, Brussels, Neerpelt, Nederrijn, Nijmegen, Lingen, Bentheim, North-West Europe 1944-45, Baghdad 1941, Iraq 1941, Palmyra, Syria 1941, El Alamein, North Africa 1942–43, Arezzo, Advance to Florence, Gothic Line, Italy 1944
Wadi al Batin, Gulf 1991, Al Basrah, Iraq 2003.
Afghanistan War

Commanding Officers
The Commanding Officers of the regiment have been:
Lt Col Emerson M. Turnbull: November 1959–April 1962
Lt Col Julian P. Fane: April 1962–May 1964
Lt Col Sir James W. Scott: May 1964–October 1966
Lt Col Ian B. Baillie: October 1966–May 1969
Lt Col Henry Desmond A. Langley: May 1969–September 1971
Lt Col Simon E.M. Bradish-Ellammes: December 1971–December 1973
Lt Col Simon C. Cooper: December 1973–August 1976
Lt Col Andrew J. Hartigan: August 1976–October 1978
Lt Col Arthur B.S.H. Gooch: October 1978–February 1981
Lt Col James B. Emson: February 1981–July 1983
Lt Col Timothy J. Earl: July 1983–November 1985
Lt Col V.Anthony L. Goodhew: November 1985–June 1988
Lt Col James W.M. Ellery: June 1988–December 1990
Lt Col Anthony P. de Ritter: December 1990–October 1992

Colonels-in-Chief
The Colonels-in-Chief of the regiment were:
21 May 1922 – 1 February 1936: Field Marshal King George V
1 February 1936 – 10 December 1936: Field Marshal King Edward VIII
10 December 1936 – 6 February 1952: Field Marshal King George VI
6 February 1952 – 8 September 2022: Queen Elizabeth II
8 September 2022 — present: Field Marshal King Charles III

Regimental Colonels
The Regimental Colonels were:
1922: 	Maj-Gen. Hon. Sir Cecil Edward Bingham (from 2nd Life Guards; Joint Colonel)
1922: 	F.M. Sir Edmund Henry Hynman Allenby, 1st Viscount Allenby (from 1st Life Guards; Joint Colonel)
1936–1957: Maj-Gen. Alexander Augustus Frederick William Alfred George Cambridge, 1st Earl of Athlone
1957–1965: F.M. The Rt Hon Allan Francis John Harding, 1st Baron Harding of Petherton
1965–1979: Lt-Gen. The Rt Hon Louis Francis Albert Victor Nicholas Mountbatten, 1st Earl Mountbatten of Burma
1979–1999: Maj-Gen. Lord Michael Fitzalan-Howard
1999–2019: F.M. The Rt Hon Charles Ronald Llewellyn Guthrie, Baron Guthrie
2019–present: Lt-Gen. Sir Edward Alexander Smyth-Osbourne

Gallery

Notes

References

Bibliography

External links

 Unofficial site for serving and ex-Life Guards of all ranks (archive copy)

Military units and formations established in 1922
Cavalry regiments of the British Army
Guards regiments
Household Cavalry
Positions within the British Royal Household
Regiments of the British Army in World War II
1922 establishments in the United Kingdom